Tong Hoon Lee (born July 18, 1973) is an American stage, film and television actor, known for playing Job in the Cinemax original series Banshee and the King in the Broadway revival of The King and I, and voicing Hamato Yoshi/Splinter in the 2012 version of Teenage Mutant Ninja Turtles and Shredder in Rise of the Teenage Mutant Ninja Turtles.

Early life and career
Lee graduated from Harvard University in 1994. He appeared in 2001 in the Broadway production of Urinetown. He played many roles over the years until he was cast as Rosencrantz in a musical version of Hamlet. In 2008, Lee won a Theatre World Award for Distinguished Performance in Yellow Face.

In television, Lee got his first role as Dr. Mao in an episode of Sex and the City in 2003. He also made guest appearances in Law & Order, Fringe, Royal Pains, White Collar, NCIS: New Orleans and other series. He also had small roles in movies such as Saving Face, We Own the Night, Premium Rush, and The Oranges.

In March 2012, he was cast in a starring role as Job, a crossdressing ultra-level computer hacker, in the television series Banshee.

On June 18, 2015, it was announced that Lee will succeed Jose Llana in the role of the King of Siam in Lincoln Center's Tony-winning revival of The King and I. Lee formally joined the cast on September 29, 2015, playing the King until April 2016.

Personal life
Lee's parents are Jung Ja Lee and Moon Soo Lee, and his brother is Tony Lee, the renowned club volleyball coach at MIT (winning the 2014 nationals competition). Lee was born in Plymouth, Massachusetts. 
He married Sekiya Lavone Billman in October 2008. They met in 2001 while performing in a production of Making Tracks at a benefit in Taipei, Taiwan, for Second Generation, an Asian-American theater company in Manhattan.

Filmography

Film

Television

Video games

References

External links
 
 
 
 Hoon Lee at the Internet Off-Broadway Database
 Hoon Lee's Broadway Bio
 Hoon Lee's aboutheartist Bio

1973 births
Living people
People from Plymouth, Massachusetts
American male actors of Korean descent
American male film actors
American male television actors
American male video game actors
American male voice actors
Harvard University alumni
20th-century American male actors
21st-century American male actors
Actors from Massachusetts
Theatre World Award winners